Eve's Daughter is a 1918 American silent comedy-drama film produced by Famous Players-Lasky and distributed by Paramount Pictures. The film was directed by James Kirkwood and starred popular theatre star Billie Burke.

The film is based on the 1917 Broadway play Eve's Daughter by Alicia Ramsey which starred Grace George.

It is now considered to be a lost film.

Cast
Billie Burke as Irene Simpson-Bates
Thomas Meighan as John Norton
Lionel Atwill as Courtenay Urquhart
Riley Hatch as Martin Simpson
Florence Flinn as Victoria Vanning
Harriet Ross as Mrs. Simpson-Bates
Lucille Carney as Edith Simpson-Bates
Mary Navarro as Kate Simpson-Bates (aka Mary Anderson)
Harry Lee as Reverend James Sunningdale
Clarence Doyle
Jimmie Gormon
Ivy Shannon

Reception
Like many American films of the time, Eve's Daughter was subject to cuts by city and state film censorship boards. For example, the Chicago Board of Censors cut, in Reel 3, two scenes of man rubbing woman's arm (one in drawing room and other in dining room), Reel 4, the intertitle "My pal. Alice Duveen went to Paris with him", man rubbing woman's arm on couch, and, Reel 5, the three intertitles "It need make no difference to us", "You'll look after me like Alice Duveen", and "I thought you understood. I can't marry you."

References

External links

Eve's Daughter at AllMovie
Advertisement for film

1918 films
American silent feature films
Lost American films
American films based on plays
Films directed by James Kirkwood Sr.
Paramount Pictures films
1918 comedy-drama films
American black-and-white films
1918 lost films
1910s American films
Silent American comedy-drama films
1910s English-language films
Lost comedy-drama films